Ichizō, also written Ichizo, Ichizou or Ichizoh is a Japanese masculine given name. People with this name include:

Ichizō Kobayashi (小林一三, 1873–1953), Japanese industrialist
Ichizo Nakata (中田一三, born 1973), Japanese football player
Kataoka Ichizo (片岡市蔵), kabuki stage name which originated in early 19th-century Osaka

References

Japanese masculine given names